Land & Sea is the fifth studio album by Canadian singer-songwriter and pianist Sarah Slean, released on September 27, 2011. It is a double album consisting of the more pop-oriented tunes of Land, and the mellow and orchestral songs of Sea.

The album debuted at No. 48 in Canada.

Track listing

Land

 All songs produced by Joel Plaskett, except "Everybody's On TV" by Royal Wood and Sarah Slean, and "Set It Free" by Greg Johnston.

Sea

 All songs produced by Jonathan Goldsmith and Sarah Slean, except "Attention Archers" and "My Eyes & Your Eyes" by Sarah Slean.
 Strings arrangements on "Napoleon", "The Right Words", "The One True Love" and "Cosmic Ballet" by Sarah Slean; on "You're Not Alone", "Everything by the Gallon" and "The Devil & The Dove" by Jonathan Goldsmith.

Singles
 "Set It Free" (May 2, 2011). A music video was also produced.

References

External links
Sarah Slean's official website
Sarah Slean's official YouTube channel
Sarah Slean's artist page on the Pheromone Recordings website

2011 albums
Sarah Slean albums